Kosmos 120 ( meaning Cosmos 120) or Zenit-2 No.41 was a Soviet, first generation, low resolution, optical film-return reconnaissance satellite launched in 1966.

Kosmos 120 was launched by a Voskhod 11A57 serial number N15001-13 carrier rocket, flying from Site 31/6 at the Baikonur Cosmodrome. The launch took place at 11:02 GMT on 8 June 1966, and following its successful arrival in orbit the spacecraft received its Kosmos designation; along with the International Designator 1966-050A and the Satellite Catalog Number 02196. This was the first time a Voskhod had been used to launch a Zenit-2 satellite; previous launches had used Vostok-2 rockets while the Voskhod was typically used to launch Zenit-4 spacecraft.

After eight days in orbit, Kosmos 120 was deorbited, with its return capsule descending under parachute, landing at 09:36 GMT on 16 June 1966, and recovered by Soviet force.

References

Kosmos satellites
Spacecraft launched in 1966
Spacecraft which reentered in 1966
Zenit-2 satellites
1966 in the Soviet Union